Giuseppe Colizzi (28 June 1925 – 23 August 1978) was an Italian film director, writer and producer.

Colizzi was best known for his spaghetti westerns starring Bud Spencer and Terence Hill.

Filmography 
 Beautiful Families (1964)
 Dio perdona... Io no! (1967); a.k.a. Blood River (US); God Forgives... (US); a.k.a. God Forgives... I Don't! (US)
 I quattro dell'Ave Maria (1968); a.k.a. Ace High (UK) (US); a.k.a. Four Gunmen of Ave Maria ; Have Gun Will Travel (UK)
 La collina degli stivali (1969); a.k.a. Boot Hill (US); a.k.a. Boot Hill: Trinity Rides Again (US: video box title); a.k.a. Trinity Rides Again
 Arrivano Joe e Margherito (1974); a.k.a. Run, Run, Joe!
 Più forte, ragazzi! (1972); a.k.a. All the Way Boys (US); a.k.a. Plane Crazy (US)
Run, Run, Joe! (1974)
Switch (1979) (Postumus)

References

External links

1925 births
1978 deaths
Film directors from Rome
Italian film producers
Spaghetti Western directors
Accademia Nazionale di Arte Drammatica Silvio D'Amico alumni
20th-century Italian screenwriters
Italian male screenwriters
20th-century Italian male writers